Yuri Nikolaevich Marichev (born 1960) is a former volleyball player and the coach of the Russian women's national volleyball team 2013—2016.

Playing career
In 1991, Marichev won the gold medal in the Soviet Volleyball League. Also in 1991, he won the Turkish League, the European Cup and the European Super Cup, all with the Turkish team.

Coaching
Marichev became a coach of the national women's volleyball team in January 2013 after the death of Coach Sergei Ovchinnikov. In 2005, he won the gold medal at FIVB Men's World Junior Championship with the Russian men's team. In 2013, he won the gold medal at the CEV European Championship in Germany and Switzerland. In 2014, he won the bronze medal at the World Grand Prix and took 5th place at the FIVB Volleyball Women's World Championship in Italy. In 2015, he won the bronze medal at the World Grand Prix and won the gold medal at the CEV European Championship in the Netherlands and Belgium.

References

Russian volleyball coaches
1960 births
Living people
Ural Ufa volleyball players
Sportspeople from Tula, Russia
Soviet men's volleyball players
Russian men's volleyball players